In August 1928, the U.S. state of Virginia renumbered many of its state highways. This renumbering was caused by a new law that greatly increased the state highway mileage. The old system, in which three-digit routes were spurs of two-digit routes, was unwieldy for a large number of routes, and so a new system, in which three-digit routes were assigned by district, was adopted.

List of routes

Two-digit routes, 10-55

District 1

District 2

District 3

District 4

District 5

District 6

District 7

District 8

References
Virginia Highways Project
CTB Meeting Archives

 Renumbering 1928
Virginia State Highway Renumbering, 1928
State Highway Renumbering, 1928
History of Virginia
Highway renumbering in the United States
 Renumbering 1928